Two vessels of the Royal Navy have borne the name HMS Oroonoko, after Oroonoko, or possibly the Orinoco:

 HMS Oroonoko was the Courser-class gun-brig HMS Steady (ex GB-19), launched in 1797, that was renamed Oroonoko in 1805 when she was converted to a temporary prison ship at Trinidad. She was sold in 1806 at Barbados.
  was the French privateer Eugène, which the Royal Navy bought in 1805 to replace the previous Oroonoko at Port-of-Spain, Trinidad. She was sold in 1814.

See also
 HMS Oronoque

Royal Navy ship names